In Jackson Heights is a 2015 documentary film about the communities of Jackson Heights, Queens, New York City directed by Frederick Wiseman. The film received widespread critical acclaim. In 2017, the film was considered the thirteenth "Best Film of the 21st Century So Far" by The New York Times.

Synopsis
The film documents events in Jackson Heights including "a Muslim school, a Jewish center, a meeting of gay and transgender people, a City Council office and the local headquarters of Make the Road New York, an activist organization dedicated to Latino and working-class people."

Release

Critical response
In Jackson Heights has received positive reviews from critics. Review aggregator Rotten Tomatoes gives the film an approval rating of 95%, based on 39 reviews, with an average rating of 8.3/10. On Metacritic, the film has a score of 81 out of 100, based on 12 critics, indicating "universal acclaim".

In a review for the Los Angeles Times, Michael Phillips wrote that "True to Wiseman's form, In Jackson Heights contains no on-screen identification of camera subjects, no voice-over narration and little in the way of overt polemics. By the end, you arrive at the essential paradox found in every Wiseman portrait: a clear sense of just how cloudy our world and our environments have become." Writing for The New York Times, Manohla Dargis stated that "Mr. Wiseman’s latest documentary is a movingly principled, political look at a dynamic neighborhood in which older waves of pioneers make room for new, amid creeping gentrification."

In Peter Bradshaw's review for The Guardian, he described it as "an engaging portrait — film-making which works from the ground up."

Accolades

Box office
As of 4 November 2016, the film has grossed $121,094 at the box office.

References

External links

2015 films
2015 documentary films
American documentary films
Films set in Queens, New York
Documentary films about New York City
Documentary films about immigration to the United States
Films directed by Frederick Wiseman
Jackson Heights, Queens
2010s English-language films
2010s American films